The 2004 Women's Four Nations Hockey Tournament was a women's field hockey tournament, consisting of a series of test matches. It was held in Alcalá la Real, Spain, from July 30 to August 3, 2004, and featured four of the top nations in women's field hockey. The event was held as a precursor to the upcoming Olympic Games.

Competition format
The tournament featured the national teams of Argentina, Australia, the Netherlands, and the hosts, Spain, competing in a round-robin format, with each team playing each other once. Three points were awarded for a win, one for a draw, and none for a loss.

Officials
The following umpires were appointed by the International Hockey Federation to officiate the tournament:

 Caroline Brunekreef (NED)
 Soledad Iparraguirre (ARG)
 Anne McRae (GBR)
 Mónica Rivera (ESP)
 Melissa Trivic (AUS)

Results
All times are local (Argentina Standard Time).

Preliminary round

Fixtures

Classification round

Third and fourth place

Final

Statistics

Final standings

Goalscorers

References

External links
Hockey Australia
Confederación Argentina de HOCKEY

2004 in women's field hockey
International women's field hockey competitions hosted by Spain
July 2004 sports events in Europe
August 2004 sports events in Europe